Norwegian nationality law is based on the principle of jus sanguinis.  In general, Norwegian citizenship is conferred by birth to a Norwegian parent, or by naturalisation in Norway.

Birth in Norway

In general, birth in Norway does not, in itself, confer Norwegian citizenship as its law uses jus sanguinis policy. Exceptions are made for stateless people and foundlings.

Descent from a Norwegian parent
Regardless of the place of birth, a child acquires Norwegian citizenship at birth if either parent is a Norwegian citizen. Originally, citizenship was only passed on to the children of Norwegian mothers, as they were the only provable parents, but over time a presumption of paternal parentage created citizenship for the child, and eventually even excluded the maternal jus sanguinis.  In more recent times, as of 1 January 1979, mothers' rights to automatically pass on their Norwegian citizenship has been reestablished. The requirement that the mother and father be married to one another was abolished on 1 September 2006.

Naturalisation as a Norwegian citizen
Generally, it is possible to naturalise as a Norwegian citizen after residing in Norway eight years over the last eleven years, if the applicant qualifies for permanent residence and does not have a criminal record.

Exceptions:
 Applicants with a criminal record must wait a further "quarantine" period dependent on the crime committed before being granted citizenship. 
 Citizens of other Nordic Council countries may naturalise after only a two-year residence. 
 The spouses and non-married cohabitant partners of Norwegian citizens may naturalise as quickly as four years. The requirement is that they have resided in Norway at least three years of the last ten and that the number of years resident and the number of years married, taken together cumulatively, equals at least seven.
 The children (under the age of 18 years) of citizens of other Nordic Council countries may automatically receive naturalisation with their parents. The children of citizens naturalised from other countries may themselves receive citizenship if they have resided in Norway for the last two years.
 Former Norwegian citizens may naturalise after one year's residence during the last two years. 

From 1 September 2008 an applicant for Norwegian citizenship must also give evidence of proficiency in either Norwegian or a Sami language, or give proof of having attended classes in Norwegian for 300 hours, or meet the language requirements for university studies in Norway (i.e., demonstrate proficiency in one of the Scandinavian languages). From 1 March 2014 an applicant for Norwegian citizenship must also pass an exam about Norwegian society, laws and history.

Before 2020, a naturalized Norwegian citizen was generally expected to prove they have lost or renounced any former citizenship(s). With effect from 1 January 2020, Norway allows dual citizenship.

Notification of Norwegian citizenship
Norwegian citizenship may be acquired by notification to the Directorate of Immigration. This is a simplified form of naturalisation exempted from application fees.  

The following categories of persons are eligible for citizenship by notification

 a child aged under 18 who was born before 1 September 2006 to a Norwegian father and a foreign mother who were not married (renunciation of foreign citizenship not required)
 a child aged 12-18 adopted by a Norwegian citizen after 1 October 1999 but before 1 September 2006 (renunciation of foreign citizenship not required)
 a citizen of another Nordic Council country who has lived in Norway for 7 years
 a former Norwegian citizen who has, since the loss of Norwegian citizenship, only been a citizen of another Nordic Council state (no residence period is required provided the person has settled in Norway).

Norwegian citizenship by adoption 

As of 1 September 2006, a child under 18 adopted by Norwegian citizens acquires Norwegian citizenship automatically. In cases where children are adopted outside Norway, the consent of the Norwegian government is required.

Loss of Norwegian citizenship
Norwegian citizens who acquire citizenship by birth but have resided less than 2 years in Norway or 7 years in Nordic Council countries must apply to retain Norwegian citizenship before turning 22 years of age.  Applicants are not required to renounce other citizenships, but are required to demonstrate "adequate ties" to Norway.  Often, frequent travel to Norway or a year of study in Norway are accepted.

Effective 1 January 2019, individuals with dual citizenship can be deprived of their citizenship should they be sentenced to six years imprisonment for serious crimes related to war crimes, terrorism, treason or espionage.

Norwegian citizens may also lose citizenship if they formally petition for permission to renounce it. To prevent statelessness, Norwegian citizenship may be renounced only if the person proves that they are a citizen of another state.

Identity fraud 
Foreigners who have acquired Norwegian citizenship may lose it if they are found to have lied about their origins. This is considered an affront to Norwegian society, which relies heavily on trust.

Dual citizenship
With effect from 1 January 2020 Norway allows dual citizenship.

A Norwegian citizen acquiring a foreign citizenship does not lose Norwegian citizenship. Former Norwegian citizens who lost Norwegian citizenship prior to this date (upon naturalisation in another country) may re-acquire Norwegian citizenship by declaration.

Travel freedom of Norwegian citizens

Visa requirements for Norwegian citizens are administrative entry restrictions by the authorities of other states placed on citizens of Norway.  Norwegian citizens had visa-free or visa on arrival access to 185 countries and territories, ranking the Norwegian passport 7th overall in terms of travel freedom (tied with the Czech Republic, Greece, Malta, the United Kingdom and the United States) according to the Henley Passport Index.

As a member of EFTA, Norwegian citizens have freedom of movement to live and work in other EFTA countries in accordance with the EFTA convention. Moreover, by virtue of Norway's membership of the European Economic Area, Norwegian citizens also have freedom of movement to live and work across all EEA member states (and until 31 December 2020, the United Kingdom).

References

External links
Norwegian Directorate of Immigration (Citizenship)
Norwegian Citizenship Law (In Norwegian)

Nationality law
Law of Norway